Perzines are a genre of zines; the "per" meaning "personal". Although most zines could be considered personal in that they represent the opinionated work of one person, this term describes zines that are written about one's own personal experiences, opinions and observations. This genre has become increasingly popular within the zine community and is probably the largest used format for zines today.

In many ways, the perzine could be considered the paper predecessor to the blog. Yet for many zine creators, the paper format is still the preferred medium, despite the blog phenomenon.

References

 
 

Neologisms
Zines